Asura flavivenosa is a moth of the family Erebidae. It is found in India.

References

flavivenosa
Moths described in 1878
Moths of Asia